Rally of Indonesia (also known as the Indonesia Rally) is the largest rallying event held in Indonesia. Currently part of the Asia Pacific Rally Championship (APRC), it has twice been incorporated into the World Rally Championship (WRC) calendar, in 1996 and 1997;  a planned running in 1998 was cancelled due to political crisis that year.

This rally is mostly held in North Sumatra, although it was also held several times in South Sumatra and South Sulawesi. 

The APRC event on 25–26 September 2010 was to be observed by the FIA as a candidate event for an inclusion to the WRC 2012 calendar, although ultimately neither event were held; the rally returned as a national event in 2013.

After nine years of absence, it was announced that Indonesia would return to the APRC in 2019 as the Rally of Indonesia, which will be held at its traditional base in North Sumatra.

List of previous winners

References

Rally competitions in Indonesia
Motorsport competitions in Indonesia
International sports competitions hosted by Indonesia
Indonesia
1986 establishments in Indonesia
Recurring sporting events established in 1986
Indonesia